Day After Tomorrow the twenty-fifth studio album (and twenty-seventh overall) by the American singer and musician Joan Baez, released in 2008. It was her first studio album in 5 years. The album features songs written by such composers as Tom Waits, Elvis Costello, T Bone Burnett, Patty Griffin, Thea Gilmore and Steve Earle. Earle also produced the album. It was recorded in Nashville between December 2007 and March 2008. The album had the dedication "to my Mom in her 96th year".

The album is released by Proper records in Europe and Razor & Tie in North America. It debuted on the UK Albums Chart at number 100. In the US it became her first charting album in 29 years, reaching number 128 on the Billboard 200 in its opening week. It was also nominated for a Grammy  (Best Contemporary Folk Album).

Track listings 
 "God Is God" (Steve Earle) – 3:29
 "Rose of Sharon" (Eliza Gilkyson) – 3:34
 "Scarlet Tide" (Elvis Costello, T Bone Burnett) – 2:25
 "Day After Tomorrow" (Tom Waits, Kathleen Brennan) – 5:31
 "Henry Russell's Last Words" (Diana Jones) – 3:37
 "I Am a Wanderer" (Steve Earle) – 2:30
 "Mary" (Patty Griffin) – 3:54
 "Requiem" (Eliza Gilkyson) – 3:55
 "The Lower Road" (Thea Gilmore) – 4:11
 "Jericho Road" (Steve Earle) – 3:29

Personnel
Joan Baez – vocals, guitar
Steve Earle – guitar, harmonium, backing vocals, tamboura
Viktor Krauss – bass
Kenny Malone – drums, percussion
Tim O'Brien – fiddle, mandolin, bouzouki, backing vocals
Darrell Scott – guitar, dobro, bouzouki, Hawaiian guitar, banjolin, resonator guitar, backing vocals
Thea Gilmore – harmony vocals
Siobhan Maher Kennedy – harmony vocals
Ray Kennedy - tambourine

Chart positions

References

External links 
Observer Music Monthly
Proper Records website

2008 albums
Joan Baez albums
Proper Records albums
Albums produced by Steve Earle
Razor & Tie albums